Psilocybe subaeruginosa is a species of agaric fungus in the family Hymenogastraceae described in 1927 and known from Australia and New Zealand. As a blueing member of the genus Psilocybe it contains the psychoactive compounds psilocin and psilocybin.

Taxonomy

Psilocybe subaeruginosa was first described in 1927 by Australian mycologist John Burton Cleland. The species name refers to the colour of the blueing reaction when the fruitbodies are damaged or handled - the feminine Latin adjective aeruginosa describes copper rust, which is verdigris or blue-green.

A type collection was not formally designated by Cleland, and the collection examined later by Guzman and Watling and called the type, with distinctive brown cystidia, is missing from Cleland's collections in Adelaide. A formal lectotype from Belair National Park Australia has since been designated (AD 5603/Cleland 13256) but without details of habitat and substrate, making an authentic concept of the species difficult to verify.

A 1992 study comparing the morphology and mating compatibility of P. australiana, P. eucalypta, P. subaeruginosa and P. tasmaniana suggested the four were synonymous and proposed combining them as P. subaeruginosa. The idea was rejected by the authors of the later species, Gastón Guzmán calling the comparisons "confused" and reprinting descriptions the same year. Despite this objection the proposal was accepted in 1995, with the exception of P. tasmaniana, which was excluded for having characteristics that did not suit the synonymy, and the specimen examined as P. tasmaniana being misidentified.

Description
The cap averages 12–50 mm in diameter. It is conical to conic-convex with slightly inrolled edges when young, and becomes convex, often slightly upturned, sub-gibbous, or sometimes with a small acute umbo. It is slightly tacky. There may be veil remnants at the margin when young. Coloured yellow-brown to orange-brown, paler towards the margin, which is a little striate, hygrophanous, fading in drying to pallid biscuit brown or pale orange-yellow. The cap stains greenish blue with age or handling and the flesh inside is whitish. The gills are moderately close, pale smoky brown when young, violet-brown or brownish fuscous in age, with narrow pale edges, slightly ventricose, in three series, the middle reaching half way to the stipe, with an adnate or broadly adnexed attachment and lines sometimes running down the stipe. The stipe is 25-70x2-3.5(-5) mm, tall and slender, equal or slightly wider towards the cap, finely vertically lined, mealy at the top with fine fibrils below, the base somewhat swollen or becoming a mass of mycelium, hollow inside, cartilaginous, pale whitish streaked with dark greyish brown, staining greenish blue, flesh brownish. A white cortinate partial veil soon disappears, leaving traces as a raised area around the upper stipe.

Taste and odour are farinaceous and the spore print is purple brown.

The cheilocystidia are 17–29 x 5.5–11, hyaline, fusoid-ventricose, subpyriform or mucronate, often with an elongated neck at the apex which is 2–4.5 µm.  The pleurocystidia measure 22–47 x 6–16 µm and is shaped like the cheilocystidia and also hyaline. The spores are smooth, subellipsoid, with an apical germ pore, measuring (10) 13.2–14.3 (15.4) x 6.6–7.7 x 6–7.5 µm.

Distribution and habitat
Psilocybe subaeruginosa grows solitary to gregarious from grassy fields, and is occasionally seen on dung. It is common in southern parts of Australia from April to August. The species is also known from Australian native and Eucalyptus forests, and famously in New Zealand on wood chip. It is probably present in New Zealand given the distribution of flora and fauna from Australia, but DNA sequencing of collections so far indicates P. allenii and P. cyanescens there rather than Australian P. subaeruginosa.

Alkaloid content
Psilocybin has been isolated from this species in 0.45% yield. In the same study, psilocin was not detectable with the analytical methods used (chromatographic separation and UV spectroscopy), and was estimated to be present at less than 1% of the psilocybin content.

In an unpublished report, psilocybin was isolated from this species at between 0.06% to 1.93%, with psilocin being between 0.0% to 0.17%.

Similar species
Psilocybe subaeruginosa is enthusiastically hunted and bears similarity to a number of other common, sometimes toxic mushrooms that are often mistaken for or hoped to be our species. These are not limited to blue, green and brightly coloured, or brown Cortinarius, the deadly Galerina marginata and other Galerina species, Hypholoma, Inocybe, Leratiomyces ceres on wood chip, Coprinellus sect. Micacei and Pholiota communis.

Genetically similar members of the genus Psilocybe include the Northern Hemisphere agarics P. allennii, P. azuresecens, and P. cyanescens, and from New Zealand P. makarorae, the undescribed partially secotioid wood chip species 'Psilocybe subsecotioides''', and the secotioid or pouch-like P. weraroa''.

References

External links

Observations of Psilocybe subaeruginosa in Australia on iNaturalist
Records and information regarding Psilocybe subaeruginosa in New Zealand at Landcare Research - Manaaki Whenua

Entheogens
Psychoactive fungi
subaeruginosa
Psychedelic tryptamine carriers
Fungi described in 1927
Fungi of Australia
Fungi native to Australia
Fungi of New Zealand
Taxa named by John Burton Cleland